Torvill and Dean's Dancing on Ice was an Australian reality television series which was based on the original British version, Dancing on Ice. The series ran for one season before being cancelled, and the winner of the competition was model Jake Wall. The series reportedly cost several million dollars to produce and received above-average ratings.

Format
The couples competed against each other for a prize at the end of the series. The ten celebrities were teamed up with ten professional ice skaters and received special training from champion ice dancing duo Jayne Torvill and Christopher Dean themselves. Home viewers voted for their favourite couples and the couple with the fewest votes were voted off the show each week until a winner was decided. The show was run in a similar format to the Seven Network's rival dancing show Dancing with the Stars which had been a major hit for the Seven Network over the previous three years.

During training almost every contestant suffered an injury of some sort, the most serious of which being Michael Slater severing a tendon in his hand after it was accidentally skated over by his partner. Giaan Rooney dislocated her ankle just before the second episode of the series, and was forced to withdraw from the competition. Annalise Braakensiek twisted her ankle during the broadcast of the first episode, and was forced to withdraw as well.

The show was hosted by celebrity gardener and backyard designer Jamie Durie and former Today weather presenter Sami Lukis. It was based on the British ITV show Dancing on Ice, which also featured Torvill and Dean, and is also roughly similar to an earlier Nine program Skating on Thin Ice, also hosted by Durie, in 2005. Kristina, Pam and Matt were also skating partners for the celebrities in the original UK version.

UK judges Karen Barber and Jason Gardiner, were joined by Alisa Camplin, Belinda Noonan, and international ice dancing judge, Mark Storton, on the judging panel. The judges only made opinions; it was up to the home viewers to make decisions.

Celebrities and their partners

Scoring chart

Red numbers indicate the lowest score of the week
Green numbers indicate the highest score of the week
 indicates that the couple were in the skate off
 indicates that the couple were eliminated
 indicates that the couple withdrew from the competition
 indicates that the couple won
 indicates that the couple came in second place

Average chart
This table only counts for dances scored on a traditional 30-point scale.

Live show details

Week 1 (11 July)

Week 2 (18 July)

Judges' votes to save
 Noonan: Michael & Anya
 Storton: Michael & Anya
 Camplin: Trisha & Alexandre
 Gardiner: Michael & Anya
 Barber: Trisha & Alexandre

Week 3 (25 July)

During the skate off, Dermott decided that his bicep injury made him unable to face another performance, effectively leading to him being eliminated and sparing the judges from a vote.

Week 4 (1 August)

Judges' votes to save
 Noonan: Jackie & Pavel
 Storton: Jackie & Pavel
 Camplin: Michael & Anya
 Gardiner: Michael & Anya
 Barber: Michael & Anya

Week 5 (8 August)

Judges' votes to save
 Noonan: 
 Storton: 
 Camplin: 
 Gardiner: 
 Barber:

Week 6 (15 August)

Judges' votes to save
 Noonan: Lara and Matt
 Storton: Lara and Matt 
 Camplin:  Lara and Matt
 Gardiner: Lara and Matt
 Barber: Lara and Matt

Week 7 (22 August)

Judges' votes to save
 Noonan: Jake & Maria
 Storton: Jake & Maria
 Camplin: Lara & Matt
 Gardiner: Lara & Matt
 Barber: Jake & Maria

Week 8 (29 August)

Ratings
The ratings for the show during the eight-week season were high in its timeslot with the series premiere being 1.61 million viewers, over the course of the rest of the season viewership was between 1.2 and 1.1 million viewers, with 1.42 million watching the grand final. Despite strong viewership figures, the show was axed due to high production costs and mostly negative reviews from critics.

Plans of a reunion special
During the series, the Nine Network planned a live reunion special, also hosted by Durie and Lukis. It would feature all ten celebrities talking about their experiences during the series, and answering questions from a live studio audience. The main highlight would be Torvill and Dean themselves making a very special guest appearance in the studio towards the end, when they would congratulate the contestants, hosts and judges, and of course, the real winners of the series, which were the home viewers, for their votes. Following the cancellation of the show, the reunion special was also cancelled.

See also
 Torvill and Dean

References

External links
Official Torvill and Dean's Dancing on Ice Website
 

Nine Network original programming
Figure skating on television
2000s Australian reality television series
Television shows set in New South Wales
2006 Australian television series debuts
2006 Australian television series endings
Figure skating in Australia
Australian television series based on British television series